The chapters of the Japanese manga Gantz are written and illustrated by Hiroya Oku, and have been published in the Japanese manga anthology Weekly Young Jump since its issue 32 published in 2000. The plot follows a teenager named Kei Kurono and his friend Masaru Kato who die in a train accident and become part of a semi-posthumous game in which they, and several other recently deceased people, are forced to hunt down and kill aliens.

Gantz is divided into three main story arcs referred to as "phases". After the completion of Phase 1, the author put the series on hiatus for a short time to work on Phase 2, which is also known as "Catastrophe". Phase 1 consists of the first 237 chapters. On November 22, 2006, the first chapter of Phase 2, chapter 238, was released. As of chapter 303, the series was put in hiatus once again in order to let Oku prepare in the making of the final arc of the series. The series continued serialization in October from 2009. The individual chapters are collected by Shueisha in tankōbon format; the first volume was released on December 11, 2000. 37 volumes have been released by Shueisha. An anime adaptation, produced by Gonzo and directed by Ichiro Itano, aired in Japan on Fuji Television and AT-X.

Publishing company Dark Horse Comics acquired the licensing rights for the release of English translations of Gantz on July 1, 2007, during the Anime Expo. The first English volume was released on June 25, 2008. While the first three were being published quarterly, the following volumes are being released on a bimonthly basis. As of July 2015, 36 volumes have been released by Dark Horse Comics. The series is published by Glénat in Spain, by Grupo Editorial Vid in Mexico, by Tonkam in France, by Planet Manga in Germany, Italy, Brazil and by Editorial Ivrea in Argentina.

Volume list
All of the Gantz chapters are published in a tankōbon volume. They were originally serialized in issues of Weekly Young Jump from December 2011 onwards.

Volumes 1–20

Volumes 21–37

See also

List of Gantz episodes
List of Gantz characters

References

Gantz
Gantz